Koiak 3 - Coptic Calendar - Koiak 5

The fourth day of the Coptic month of Koiak, the fourth month of the Coptic year. On a common year, this day corresponds to November 30, of the Julian Calendar, and December 13, of the Gregorian Calendar. This day falls in the Coptic season of Peret, the season of emergence. This day falls in the Nativity Fast.

Commemorations

Saints 

 The martyrdom of Saint Andrew, one of the Twelve Apostles

Other commemorations 

 The consecration of the Church of Saint John of Heraclia 
 The translocation of the Bodies of Saint Pishoy and Saint Paul of Tammouh

References 

Days of the Coptic calendar